Basahi Banzar is a village situated in the Lakhimpur Kheri District, Uttar Pradesh, India, near the border with Nepal. One part is covered by forest and all the three part is covered agricultural farms. The river Shardha is nearby, as are the towns Basahi and Sampurna Nagar. The nearest railway station is Palia Kalanpalia kalan. People of this region generally do farming.  Fair is also a popular event here which takes place every year. It is to celebrate harvesting festival and it is celebrate during Diwali. Most of the people are migrating for search of work to suburban and urban areas places like Bombay Punjab and few other places.

Education

Education here is not of optimal standard: there are a few schools which take care of students of these places and people are not much interested in sending their children to school as they are poor. Children start working in the farm of theirs or others as very early age.

Public Inter college, Indra siksha niketan, Oxford public schools are few mejor schools nearby.

Schools
 Primary government school (till 5th standard)
 Montessori private school (till 8th standard)
All those who are interested for their higher studies they study in nearby small city Sampurna Nagar in Public Inter College it is till 12th standard. And there are few more school owned and run by individuals.

Farming

Sugar cane is major crop and source of income. Other famous crops generally grown are paddy, wheat, pulses like masoor (lentil), pea, black gram; some other crops like barley, maize, mustard and many more; fruits like mangoes, banana, and jackfruits; vegetables for personal consumption as well as for selling in the market. Farmers use ox for tilling their land and for transporting agricultural goods. Development is also taking place rapidly as farmers are buying new equipment to enhance their yield. Tractors and trolleys can also be seen with a few farmers

Fuel

Wood is generally used for cooking purposes and agricultural waste are also used. Cow dung cakes are also important fuel as far as cooking are concerned. Woods are collected from the nearby forest in abundance due to this whole forest cut on larger scale and there are very few trees left.

Dudhwa national park

Dudhwa National Park is home to rhinos, tigers, countless animal species, birds, insects, reptiles etc. Dudhwa National Park is located in the Terai of Uttar Pradesh, India and covers an area of 490 km2 with a buffer area of almost 124 km2. The area was established in 1958 as a wildlife sanctuary, 1977 as a national park, 1988 as a tiger reserve. Dudhwa Tiger Reserve lies on the India-Nepal border in the foothills of the Himalayas.

Villages in Lakhimpur Kheri district